My Name Is Nobody is a 1973 Italian/French/German international co-production comedy Spaghetti Western starring Terence Hill and Henry Fonda. The film was directed by Tonino Valerii and based on an idea by Sergio Leone.

The film follows the story of Nobody (Terence Hill) who attempts to get his idol Jack Beauregard (Henry Fonda) to take on the Wild Bunch gang of outlaws.

Plot
Jack Beauregard is an aging gunslinger who wants to retire peacefully to Europe. After watching him quickly shoot three gunmen who attempted to ambush him in a barbershop, the barber's son asks his father if there is anyone in the world faster than Beauregard, to which the barber replies, "Faster than him? Nobody!"
Beauregard pauses to watch a down-and-out catching fish before continuing to an old goldmine. He finds his friend Red dying after an attack by a gang. Beauregard asks Red about the whereabouts of "Nevada" but Red only manages to disclose Nevada's village before dying. At a horse relay station, the down-and-out is asked by three men to deliver a basket to Beauregard inside where he talks to Beauregard, revealing his detailed knowledge of Beauregard's feats. He throws the basket outside where the bomb that was hidden inside explodes. The bum introduces himself as "Nobody". He idolizes Beauregard and wants him to end his career in style by taking on all 150 of the Wild Bunch single-handed. The bandits are using a worthless goldmine to launder their stolen gold. Sullivan, the mine owner fronting for them, believes Beauregard is trying to kill him, so he tries to kill him first.

Arriving at Nevada's village, Beauregard finds Nobody already there who reveals that the Nevada Kid, Beauregard's brother, is dead. Nobody again unsuccessfully tries to get Beauregard to take on the Wild Bunch. Arriving in a town, Sullivan hires Nobody to kill Beauregard, but Nobody instead helps Beauregard to take out Sullivan's men. The Wild Bunch ride into town to collect sticks of dynamite, stashing them in their saddlebags.

Later, an old man tells Beauregard that he was bought out of a worthless gold mine by his partners Nevada and Red, only to have the mine produce much gold afterwards. Beauregard hurries off to the mine and catches Sullivan loading sacks of gold powder. Sullivan offers Beauregard Nevada's share, but Beauregard tells him he could not care less about his brother, and just takes two sacks, as well as $500 to pay for his passage to Europe. He then leaves to catch a train to New Orleans.

Nobody steals a train that is being loaded at a station with bars of gold, guarded by soldiers. Beauregard is waiting down the line when the Wild Bunch charge towards him across a featureless plain. Nobody arrives with the train, but refuses to rescue Beauregard until he "makes his name in the history books". Remembering the mirrored conchas on the gang’s dynamite-filled saddlebags, Beauregard shoots them and takes out most of the gang until Nobody lets him board the train.
 
In New Orleans, Beauregard and Nobody duel in the street, with a photographer and many spectators on hand. Nobody is faster, and Beauregard falls to the ground, apparently dead. The remaining members of the Wild Bunch see it and switch their search to the anonymous Nobody. Later, Nobody walks by the ship that was to take Beauregard to Europe where Beauregard is revealed to be in his cabin aboard, writing Nobody an affectionate farewell.

Cast

Production
Shooting for My Name Is Nobody started on April 30, 1973. It was one of the few films related to Sergio Leone where 80% of the outdoor scenes were actually shot in the United States. The film was shot in nine weeks.

Filming took place at Acoma Pueblo, the ghost town of Cabezon, the former mining town of Mogollon, the mission of San Esteban Del Rey in New Mexico and in the gypsum dunes at White Sands. Leone predominantly stayed at home for the shoot and went to join the crew for five days in New Orleans. Leone replaced director Tonino Valerii, who was suffering from an ear infection, for one day on the set.

Tensions rose on set between cinematographer Armando Nannuzzi and Valerii. Fonda was being told how to pick up money off the ground and was told two different ways to pick up between Valerii and Nannuzzi. Their relationship became more intense, with Nannuzzi eventually leaving the film.

Directorial credit dispute
When the film began shooting in Spain in Almería and Guadix, Valerii had a new cinematographer Giuseppe Ruzzolini and Sergio Salvati. Salvati worked as a cameraman uncredited for the sequences of the duel among mirrors and Nobody's meeting with Sullivan in the gambling room. A new problem arose on set when costumes for Henry Fonda vanished, leading to production stopping for nine days. This led to paying a high penalty to keep Fonda for a few days or postpone shooting until he was free again. Leone proposed to Valerii that they either cut 30 or 40 pages from the script or create a second unit to finish the film. Leone offered to take the second unit shots, which Valerii accepted. Claudio Mancini warned Valerii, stating that Leone would take credit for the film when they go back to Rome if he let him shoot anything. Valerii took over scenes involving Henry Fonda and the action sequences in the desert, while Leone directed the saloon scene with Terence Hill showing his gunslinger skills and parts of the sequences in the village festival, and the public urinal scene which was not in the original script.

Assumptions range over how much Leone contributed to the film. Christopher Frayling wrote: "the most likely scenario is that Leone helped out on a duel, then took over second-unit work on 'the battle', and then directed the opening scenes and the carnival section of the film." John Landis, who has claimed to be an extra in the film, said: "We shot for a couple of weeks, among hundreds of extras on horseback, attacking and firing wildly. Fonda and Hill kept us all at bay. [...] Leone directed that battle on horseback."  Neil Summers who played Squirrel stated that Leone "directed most of the scenes I was in [...] [Leone] worked slowly and was constantly trying new angles with his camera and new innovative shots with his actors."  Valerii himself stated that "scenes filmed by Leone are: Terence Hill getting drunk in the saloon (but not the close-ups of that shattering glasses, I shot those myself; and also the footage of the betting, with Piero Lulli taking the money, is mine); the part of the sequence at the fair which starts from the moment where Nobody steals the apple from the boy, to the episode of the pies thrown at the negroes' faces; the digression in the public urinal, [...] and several close-ups of Nobody who, while Beauregard fights the Wild Bunch, takes note of the body count as if they were points at a game, another addition on the part of Leone, who thought it was a funny idea." Screenwriter Ernesto Gastaldi confirmed Valerii's comments stating that "Tonino shot the whole film, absolutely ON HIS OWN" and that Leone "organized a second unit crew and shot a couple of sequences, which in my opinion are the weakest in the film: the urinal, stretched in an abnormal way, and the glass contest in the saloon. Nothing else." Sergio Donati expanded on this, stating that some photographers were sent over by the press office, and asked Leone, who was on set for a single day, to sit behind camera in a director's pose with Valerii's permission. Donati stated that "inevitably, from that moment on, everyone, in and outside the movie business started saying "Yeah, actually the real director of the film was Leone, who saved it from the disaster of an incapable director". Leone's own discussion following the film's release often contradicted itself.

Release
Prior to its release in Italy, My Name Is Nobody was released in West Germany and France on December 13 and 14 respectively. In Germany the movie sold about 6.2 million admissions. Italian audiences got to see it starting 21 December 1973, where it was distributed by Titanus. The film grossed over 3.6 billion lire and was the third highest-grossing film in Italy of the year, behind Salvatore Samperi's Malicious (5.5 billion lire) and Dino Risi's Sessomatto. In the United States, it was cut to 111 minutes and "nearly flopped" according to Italian film historian Roberto Curti.

In 2015, a novelization of the film by Michael R. Hudson was published in the United States by Raven Head Press as part of a series of adaptations of several of Gastaldi's scripts, including The Horrible Dr. Hichcock and The Case of the Bloody Iris.

Reviews

Contemporary reviews are positive. Vincent Canby in The New York Times considered the film "very entertaining" and it "is the kind of Western that only an immensely appreciative and witty Italian film maker could make."

References

Bibliography

External links

1973 films
1970s buddy comedy films
1970s Western (genre) comedy films
English-language French films
English-language Italian films
Films directed by Tonino Valerii
Films set in 1899
Films scored by Ennio Morricone
French Western (genre) comedy films
1970s Italian-language films
Italian buddy comedy films
Italian parody films
Spaghetti Western films
Films shot in Almería
Films with screenplays by Ernesto Gastaldi
1973 comedy films
1970s Italian films
1970s French films